Narat-Yelga (Naratyılğa) is a rural locality (a selo) in Mustafinsky Selsoviet, Bakalinsky District, Bashkortostan, Russia. The population was 120 as of 2010. There are 3 streets.

Geography 
Narat-Yelga is located 27 km southwest of Bakaly (the district's administrative centre) by road. Ustyumovo is the nearest rural locality.

References 

Rural localities in Bakalinsky District